The National Council of Churches in the Philippines (NCCP) is a fellowship of ten Protestant and non Roman Catholic Churches in the Philippines denominations, and ten service-oriented organizations in the Philippines. A member of the World Council of Churches and the Christian Conference of Asia, the NCCP represents close to twelve million Protestant adherents. Advocacy for environmental protection and against large-scale mining are part of its core mission. Christian organizations other than churches may be received as associate members.

History and structure
The NCCP was established in 1963. Its forerunners include the Philippine Federation of Christian Churches in 1949; the Philippine Federation of Evangelical Churches in 1939; the National Christian Council in 1929; the Evangelical Union in 1901; and the Missionary Alliance in 1900. 

It is currently organised in ten regional ecumenical councils:

 Cordillera
 Cagayan Valley
 Pangasinan-Ilocos-La Union-Abra
 Romblon-Mindoro
 Palawan
 Western Visayas
 Eastern Visayas
 Cotabato
 Misamis Oriental-Camiguin-Butuan-Lanao
 Basilan-Zamboanga-Misamis Occidental Regional Ecumenical Council

The NCCP headquarters is located at 879 Epifanio de los Santos Avenue, West Triangle, Quezon City, 1104 Philippines. Its General Secretary is the Bishop Reuel Norman O. Marigza of the United Church of Christ in the Philippines.

Vision and mission

Vision
Life in all its Fullness is what Jesus Christ lived and died for. NCCP envisions this life in a just, egalitarian, self-reliant, and sustainable society. 

Mission
Our faith and vision move us to be an ecumenical fellowship of churches, be a channel for united witness and common action, by being in solidarity with the people in the struggle for justice, peace and the integrity of creation.

List of member churches
Some of member denominations and service-oriented organizations are:

List of associate members
 Association of Christian Schools, Colleges and Universities (ACSCU)
 Consortium of Christian Organizations for Rurban Development (CONCORD)
 Ecumenical Church Loan Foundation, Inc. (ECLOF)
 Kaisahang Buhay Foundation (KBF)
 Lingap Pangkabataan, Inc. (LPI)
 Manila Community Service, Inc. (MCSI)
 Philippine Bible Society (PBS)
 Student Christian Movement of the Philippines (SCMP)
 Union Church of Manila (UCM)

Radio stations
NCCP owns a few stations across the country.

See also
 Philippine Council of Evangelical Churches
 Christianity in the Philippines
 Roman Catholicism in the Philippines
 Philippine Orthodox Church
 Protestantism in the Philippines
 Buddhism in the Philippines
 Hinduism in the Philippines
 Islam in the Philippines
 Mga Awit sa Pagsamba

References

External links
 Official Website of the National Council of Churches in the Philippines

National councils of churches
Christian organizations based in Asia
Christian denominations in the Philippines
Christian organizations established in 1963
1963 establishments in the Philippines